The Neveazzurra (Blue-snow) is a winter sports area in the Italian Alps, in Verbanio Cusio Ossola province (Piedmont).
150 kilometers of trails, 50 lifts from 1,000 to 3,000 meters and the opportunity to practice a wide variety of winter sports: alpine skiing, cross country skiing, off-piste skiing, downhill skiing, snow park, ice skating and ice climbing, free -Ride and heli-skiing.

Stations of the ski area
The most well known of the ski area include:
Alpe Devero, 
Antrona Cheggio, 
Ceppo Morelli, 
Domobianca (Domodossola), 
Druogno, 
Formazza, 
Macugnaga, 
Mottarone, 
Piana di Vigezzo, 
Pian di Sole, 
 San Domenico di Varzo.

SkiArea VCO
Neveazzurra ski resort has implemented SkiArea VCO: a project of integrated access to the stations of Neveazzura resort, that uses the Openpass standard.

References

External links
 Official SkiArea VCO site (Italian)

Ski areas and resorts in Italy